The Two Sides of the Smothers Brothers (released September 1, 1962 on Mercury Records) is the second comedy album by the Smothers Brothers.  Side 1 (tracks 1-6) consisted of comedy and was recorded at The Crystal Palace in St. Louis during a live performance.  Side 2 (tracks 7-12) was recorded at the Bell Sound Studios in New York City with a full orchestra and represented the singing side of the boys. The Two Sides of the Smothers Brothers reached number 26 on the Billboard Pop Albums chart.

According to the liner notes to their compilation album Sibling Revelry: The Best of the Smothers Brothers, The Two Sides of the Smothers Brothers was the biggest selling album of their career. It spent sixty-six weeks on the Billboard album chart, and peaked at #26.

According to the book Dangerously Funny, half the album was dedicated to straight music because the duo hadn't yet developed enough new comedy material for a second album. The brothers performed their original act in its entirety on their first album, The Smothers Brothers at the Purple Onion.

Track listing
"Chocolate" (2:35) - Tom sings of how he fell into a 30 foot vat of chocolate.
"Hangman" (0:55) - "Hangman, hangman, slack your rope..."
"I Don't Care" (0:35) - Tom's version of "Jimmy Crack Corn"
"Laredo" (2:56) - Also known as "The Cowboy's Lament"
"Cabbage" (6:37) - The boys' version of the American folk song  includes Tom's history lesson on railroads, pumas and '' .
"Map of the World (Let the Rest of the World Go By)" (2:05) - The story of a young lady who showed up to a costume party tattooed as a map of the world.
"Stella's Got a New Dress" (2:11)
"Where the Lilac Grows" (2:55) - "Greensleeves" with contemporary lyrics.
"If It Fits Your Fancy" (2:53)
"The Four Winds and the Seven Seas" (3:37)
"Sailor's Lament" (2:05)
"Apples, Peaches and Cherries" (3:01)

Personnel
Dick Smothers – vocals, double bass
Tom Smothers – vocals, guitar

Chart positions

References

Roman, Shari.  "Sibling Revelry--The Best of The Smothers Brothers" (Liner notes). Rhino Records, 1998 CD re-issue.

External links
Smothers Brothers' discography can be found here.

1962 albums
Smothers Brothers albums
Mercury Records albums
1962 live albums
Mercury Records live albums